Emmet Clifford Birk (March 21, 1914 – November 6, 2000) was an American professional basketball player. He played for the Oshkosh All-Stars in the National Basketball League for one game during the 1938–39 season. In college, he played for the University of North Dakota (UND), where he won North Central Conference championships all three years he played. He was inducted into the UND Hall of Fame in 1977.

In his post-basketball career, Birk spent five years serving in the Army during World War II. He then moved to Whittier, California and spent 45 years as a schoolteacher and coach.

References

1914 births
2000 deaths
United States Army personnel of World War II
American men's basketball players
Basketball players from North Dakota
Forwards (basketball)
North Dakota Fighting Hawks men's basketball players
Oshkosh All-Stars players
People from Walsh County, North Dakota
Sportspeople from Whittier, California